Hometown Boys may refer to:

Hometown Boys, band formed by Clayton McMichen in 1918 
Hometown Boys (Tejano band)